David Wright "Dave" Cruikshank (born January 11, 1969 in Chicago, Illinois) is a four-time U.S. Olympic speedskater, an NHL skating and performance coach, owner of DC Hybrid Skating, a performance training center for hockey players in Milwaukee, WI.

Personal life

Cruikshank attended Glenbrook North High School, where he played varsity baseball and soccer; he graduated magna cum laude from Carroll College with a degree in Business Management. He is the husband of five-time Olympic gold medalist Bonnie Blair, one of the top female speed skaters of her time and one of the most decorated female athletes in Olympic history. Blair and Cruikshank married at the ages of 32 and 27 respectively.

Speedskating career

After attending a speedskating practice, Cruikshank switched from ice hockey to speedskating at the age of eight in Northbrook, Illinois, an area known for its strong tradition of speedskating Olympians. He became a member of the World Short Track Team in 1986.

In 1987, at the age of seventeen, he won the Junior World 500 meters, his first major long track international competition; a year later, he made the 1988 Olympic Team, winning the 1,000 meters at the Olympic Trials. 

In 1989, Cruikshank medaled in a World Cup competition and placed 13th overall in his first World Sprint Championships; Cruikshank's career continued, resulting in his making more World Championship Teams and three more Olympic Teams (1992, 1994, and 1998).

US Speedskating inducted Cruikshank into the US Speedskating Hall of Fame in 2008; Cruikshank had competed in international long track events for 16 years.

Skating and performance coach career

After retiring from skating, Cruikshank founded, in November 2002, a performance training center for ice hockey players in Milwaukee, WI.

References

External links
Profile
US Speed Skating
DC Hybrid Skating
Chicago Blackhawks - The Official Website from the NHL Network
Syracuse Crunch - The Official Website from the AHL Network
Under Armour Underground - TNP Training

1969 births
Living people
American male speed skaters
Olympic speed skaters of the United States
Speed skaters from Chicago
Speed skaters from Milwaukee
Speed skaters at the 1992 Winter Olympics
Speed skaters at the 1994 Winter Olympics
Speed skaters at the 1998 Winter Olympics